Butale is a village in North East District of Botswana. It is located close to the border with Zimbabwe.  The population was 549 in 2011 census. It has primary and a health clinic.  The villagers living in this area widely rely on growing crops and also keep domestic animals.

References

Villages in Botswana